Bangor is a city in and the county seat of Penobscot County, Maine, United States. The city proper has a population of 31,753, making it the state's third-largest settlement, behind Portland (68,408) and Lewiston (37,121). 

Modern Bangor was established in the mid-19th century with the lumber and shipbuilding industries. Evidence of this is still visible in the lumber barons' elaborate Greek Revival and Victorian mansions and the 31-foot-high (9.4 m) statue of Paul Bunyan. Today, Bangor's economy is based on services and retail, healthcare, and education.

Bangor has a port of entry at Bangor International Airport, also home to the Bangor Air National Guard Base. Historically Bangor was an important stopover on the Great Circle Air Route between the U.S. East Coast and Europe.

Bangor has a humid continental climate, with cold, snowy winters, and warm summers.

Name and pronunciation
Founded as Kendeskeag Plantation, Bangor was incorporated as a New England town in 1791. The reason for the choice of name is disputed. The final syllable is pronounced gor, not ger as in Bangor, Northern Ireland.  The final syllable of the city of Bangor in north Wales is "gor" (with the "r” pronounced) in the original Welsh, but English speakers often say "ger".  In 2015, local celebrities and business owners recorded the YouTube video "How to Say Bangor"., which was sung to the tune of "We Are The World".

History

European settlement
The Penobscot people have inhabited the area around present-day Bangor for at least 11,000 years and still occupy tribal land on the nearby Penobscot Indian Island Reservation. They practised some agriculture, but less than peoples in southern New England where the climate is milder, and subsisted on what they could hunt and gather. Contact with Europeans was not uncommon during the 1500s because the fur trade was lucrative and the Penobscot were willing to trade pelts for European goods. The first European known to have explored the area in 1524 was Estêvão Gomes, a Portuguese navigator who sailed in the service of Spain in the 1520s. The Spaniards, led by Gómez, were the first Europeans to make landfall in what is now Maine, followed by the Frenchman Samuel de Champlain in 1605. The Jesuits established a mission on Penobscot Bay in 1609, which was then part of the French colony of Acadia, and the valley remained contested between France and Britain into the 1750s, making it one of the last regions to become part of New England.

In 1769, Jacob Buswell founded a settlement at the site. Then known as Norumbega, by 1772, there were 12 families, along with a sawmill, store, and school. By 1787, the population was 567. It was known as Sunbury until incorporation as Bangor in 1791.

Wars of Independence, 1812, and Civil War

In 1779, the rebel Penobscot Expedition fled up the Penobscot River and ten of its ships were scuttled by the British fleet at Bangor. The ships remained there until the late 1950s, when construction of the Joshua Chamberlain Bridge disturbed the site. Six cannons were removed from the riverbed, five of which are on display throughout the region (one was thrown back into the river by area residents angered that the archeological site was destroyed for the bridge's construction).

During the War of 1812 Bangor and Hampden were sacked by the British.

Maine was part of the Commonwealth of Massachusetts until 1820 when it voted to secede from Massachusetts and was admitted to the Union as the 23rd state under the Missouri Compromise.

In 1861, a mob ransacked the offices of the Democratic newspaper the Bangor Daily Union, threw the presses and other materials into the street and burned them. Editor Marcellus Emery escaped unharmed and it was only after the war that he resumed publishing.

During the American Civil War the locally mustered 2nd Maine Volunteer Infantry Regiment was the first to march out of Maine in 1861, and played a prominent part in the First Battle of Bull Run. The 1st Maine Heavy Artillery Regiment, mustered in Bangor and commanded by a local merchant, lost more men than any other Union regiment in the war (especially in the Second Battle of Petersburg, 1864). The 20th Maine Infantry Regiment held Little Round Top in the Battle of Gettysburg. A bridge connecting Bangor with Brewer is named for Joshua Lawrence Chamberlain, the regiment's leader and one of eight Civil War soldiers from Penobscot County towns to receive the Medal of Honor. Bangor's Charles A. Boutelle accepted the surrender of the Confederate fleet after the Battle of Mobile Bay. A Bangor residential street is named for him. The Confederate States Navy captured several Bangor ships during the Civil War.

Bangor was near the lands disputed during the Aroostook War, a boundary dispute with Britain in 1838–1839. The passion of the Aroostook War signaled the increasing role lumbering and logging played in the Maine economy, particularly in the state's central and eastern sections. Bangor arose as a lumbering boom-town in the 1830s, and a potential demographic and political rival to Portland. Bangor became for a time the largest lumber port in the world, and the site of furious land speculation that extended up the Penobscot River valley and beyond.

Industrialization: lumbering, shipping, and manufacturing

The Penobscot River drainage basin above Bangor was unattractive to settlement for farming, but well suited to lumbering. Winter snow allowed logs to be dragged from the woods by horse-teams. Carried to the Penobscot or its tributaries, log driving in the snowmelt brought them to waterfall-powered sawmills upriver from Bangor. The sawed lumber was then shipped from the city's docks, Bangor being at the head-of-tide (between the rapids and the ocean) to points anywhere in the world. Shipbuilding was also developed. Bangor capitalists also owned most of the forests. The main markets for Bangor lumber were the East Coast cities. Much was also shipped to the Caribbean and to California during the Gold Rush, via Cape Horn, before sawmills could be established in the west. Bangorians later helped transplant the Maine culture of lumbering to the Pacific Northwest, and participated directly in the Gold Rush. Bangor, Washington; Bangor, California; and Little Bangor, Nevada, are legacies of this contact.

By 1860, Bangor was the world's largest lumber port, with 150 sawmills operating along the river. The city shipped over 150 million boardfeet of lumber a year, much of it in Bangor-built and Bangor-owned ships. In the year 1860, 3,300 lumbering ships passed by the docks.

Many of the lumber barons built elaborate Greek Revival and Victorian houses that still stand in the Broadway Historic District. Bangor has many substantial old churches, and shade trees. The city was so beautiful it was called "The Queen City of the East". The shorter Queen City appellation is still used by some local clubs, organizations, events and businesses.

In addition to shipping lumber, 19th-century Bangor was the leading producer of moccasins, shipping over 100,000 pairs a year by the 1880s. Exports also included bricks, leather, and even ice (which was cut and stored in winter, then shipped to Boston, and even China, the West Indies and South America).

Bangor had certain disadvantages compared to other East Coast ports, including its rival Portland, Maine. Being on a northern river, its port froze during the winter, and it could not take the largest ocean-going ships. The comparative lack of settlement in the forested hinterland also gave it a comparatively small home market.

In 1844 the first ocean-going iron-hulled steamship in the U.S. was named The Bangor. She was built by the Harlan and Hollingsworth firm of Wilmington, Delaware in 1844, and was intended to take passengers between Bangor and Boston. On her second voyage, however, in 1845, she burned to the waterline off Castine. She was rebuilt at Bath, returned briefly to her earlier route, but was soon purchased by the U.S. government for use in the Mexican–American War.

Modern Bangor

Bangor continued to prosper as the pulp and paper industry replaced lumbering, and railroads replaced shipping. Local capitalists also invested in a train route to Aroostook County in northern Maine (the Bangor and Aroostook Railroad), opening that area to settlement.

Bangor's Hinkley & Egery Ironworks (later Union Ironworks) was a local center for invention in the 19th and early 20th centuries. A new type of steam engine built there, named the "Endeavor", won a gold medal at the New York Crystal Palace Exhibition of the American Institute in 1856. The firm won a diploma for a shingle-making machine the following year. In the 1920s, Union Iron Works engineer Don A. Sargent invented the first automotive snow plow. Sargent patented the device and the firm manufactured it for a national market.

Geography

A potential advantage that has always eluded exploitation is the city's location between the port city of Halifax, Nova Scotia, and the rest of Canada (as well as New York). As early as the 1870s, the city promoted a Halifax-to-New York railroad, via Bangor, as the quickest connection between North America and Europe (when combined with steamship service between Britain and Halifax). A European and North American Railway opened through Bangor, with President Ulysses S. Grant officiating at the inauguration, but commerce never lived up to the potential. More recent attempts to capture traffic between Halifax and Montreal by constructing an East–West Highway through Maine have also come to naught. Most overland traffic between the two parts of Canada continues to travel north of Maine rather than across it.

Urban development

Fires
Major fires struck the downtown in 1856, 1869, and 1872, the last resulting in the erection of the Adams-Pickering Block. In the Great Fire of 1911 Bangor lost its high school, post office & custom house, public library, telephone and telegraph companies, banks, two fire stations, nearly a hundred businesses, six churches, and synagogue and 285 private residences over a total of 55 acres (23 ha.) The area was rebuilt, and in the process became a showplace for a diverse range of architectural styles, including the Mansard style, Beaux Arts, Greek Revival and Colonial Revival, and is listed on the National Register of Historic Places as the Great Fire of 1911 Historic District.

Urban renewal
The destruction of downtown landmarks such as the old city hall and train station in the late 1960s urban renewal program is now considered to have been a mistake. It ushered in a decline of the city center that was accelerated by the construction of the Bangor Mall in 1978 and subsequent big-box stores on the city's outskirts. Downtown Bangor began to recover in the 1990s, with bookstores, café/restaurants, galleries, and museums filling once-vacant storefronts. The recent re-development of the city's waterfront has also helped re-focus cultural life in the historic center.

Hydrology

Bangor is on the banks of the Penobscot River, close enough to the Atlantic Ocean to be influenced by tides. Upstream, the Penobscot River drainage basin occupies  in northeastern Maine. Flooding is most often caused by a combination of precipitation and snowmelt. Ice jams can exacerbate high flow conditions and cause acute localized flooding. Conditions favorable for flooding typically occur during the spring months.

In 1807 an ice jam formed below Bangor Village raising the water 10 to 12 feet (3 to 3.7 m) above the normal highwater mark and in 1887 the freshet caused the Maine Central Railroad Company rails between Bangor and Vanceboro to be covered to a depth of several feet. Bangor's worst ice jam floods occurred in 1846 and 1902. Both resulted from mid-December freshets that cleared the upper river of ice, followed by cold that produced large volumes of frazil ice or slush which was carried by high flows forming a major ice jam in the lower river. In March of both years, a dynamic breakup of ice ran into the jam and flooded downtown Bangor. Though no people died and the city recovered quickly, the 1846 and 1902 ice jam floods were economically devastating, according to the Army Corps analysis. Both floods occurred with multiple dams in place and little to no ice-breaking in the lower river. The United States Coast Guard began icebreaker operations on the Penobscot in the 1940s, preventing the formation of frozen ice jams during the winter and providing an unobstructed path for ice-out in the spring. Long-term temperature records show a gradual warming since 1894, which may have reduced the ice jam flood potential at Bangor.

In the Groundhog Day gale of 1976 a storm surge went up the Penobscot, flooding Bangor for three hours.  At 11:15 am, waters began rising on the river and within 15 minutes had risen a total of  flooding downtown. About 200 cars were submerged and office workers were stranded until waters receded. There were no reported deaths during this unusual flash flood.

Climate
Bangor has a humid continental climate (Köppen: Dfb), with cold, snowy winters, and warm summers, and is in USDA hardiness zone 5a. There is an average of 6.1 days annually with highs at or above , with the last year to have not seen such temperatures being 2014.

The average first freeze of the season occurs on October 7, and the last May 7, resulting in a freeze-free season of 152 days; the corresponding dates for measurable snowfall, i.e. at least , are November 23 and April 4. A snow depth of at least  is on average seen 66 days per winter, including 54 days from January to March, when the snow pack is typically most reliable.

Demographics

As of 2008, Bangor is the third most populous city in Maine, as it has been for more than a century. As of 2012, the estimated population of the Bangor Metropolitan Area (which includes Penobscot County) is 153,746, indicating a slight growth rate since 2000, almost all of it accounted for by Bangor. As of 2007, Metro Bangor had a higher percentage of people with high school degrees than the national average (85% compared to 76.5%) and a slightly higher number of graduate degree holders (7.55% compared to 7.16%). It had much higher number of physicians per capita (291 vs. 170), because of the presence of two large hospitals.

Historically Bangor received many immigrants as it industrialized. Irish-Catholic and later Jewish immigrants eventually became established members of the community, along with many migrants from Atlantic Canada. Of the 205 black citizens who lived in Bangor in 1910, over a third were originally from Canada.

2010 census
As of the census of 2010, there were 33,039 people, 14,475 households, and 7,182 families residing in the city. The racial makeup of the city was 93.1% White, 1.7% African American, 1.2% Native American, 1.7% Asian, 0.3% from other races, and 2.0% from two or more races. Hispanic or Latino of any race were 1.5% of the population.

There were 14,475 households, of which 24.2% had children under the age of 18 living with them, 32.8% were married couples living together, 12.6% had a female householder with no husband present, 4.2% had a male householder with no wife present, and 50.4% were non-families. 37.9% of all households were made up of individuals, and 12.4% had someone living alone who was 65 years of age or older. The average household size was 2.10 and the average family size was 2.76.

The median age in the city was 36.7 years. 17.8% of residents were under the age of 18; 16% were between the ages of 18 and 24; 26% were from 25 to 44; 25.8% were from 45 to 64; and 14.4% were 65 years of age or older. The gender makeup of the city was 48.2% male and 51.8% female.

2020 census
As of the census of 2020, there were 31,753 people and 13,887 households residing in the city. The racial makeup of the city was 88.0% White, 2.3% African American, 1.0% Native American, 2.2% Asian, 0.9% from other races, and 5.6% from two or more races. Hispanic or Latino of any race were 2.4% of the population.

The median age in the city was 39.0 years. 18.0% of residents were under the age of 18.

Economy
Major employers in the region include:
 Services and retail: Hannaford Supermarkets, Shaw's and Star Market, Bangor Savings Bank, Walmart.
 Finance: The Bangor Savings Bank, founded in 1852, is Maine's largest independent bank; as of 2013, it had more than $2.8 billion in assets and the largest share of the 13-bank Bangor market.
 Healthcare: Eastern Maine Medical Center (now Northern Light Healthcare), Acadia Hospital, St. Joseph's Healthcare, Community Health & Counseling Services.
 Education: University of Maine, Beal University, Husson University, Eastern Maine Community College
 Manufacturing: General Electric.

Bangor is the largest market town, distribution center, transportation hub, and media center in a five-county area whose population tops 330,000 and which includes Penobscot, Piscataquis, Hancock, Aroostook, and Washington counties.

Bangor's City Council has approved a resolution opposing the sale of sweat-shop-produced clothing in local stores.

Tourism

Outdoor activities in the Bangor City Forest and other nearby parks, forests, and waterways include hiking, sailing, canoeing, hunting, fishing, skiing, and snowmobiling.

Bangor Raceway at the Bass Park Civic Center and Auditorium offers live, pari-mutuel harness racing from May through July and then briefly in the fall. Hollywood Casino, operated by Penn National Gaming, originally opened as a slot machine only facility. In 2007, construction began on a $131-million casino complex in Bangor that houses, among other things, a gaming floor with about 1,000 slot machines, an off-track betting center, a seven-story hotel, and a four-level parking garage. In 2011, it was authorized to add table games.

Military installations
Bangor Air National Guard Base is a United States Air National Guard base. Created in 1927 as a commercial field, it was taken over by the U.S. Army just before World War II. In 1968, the base was sold to the city of Bangor, Maine, to become Bangor International Airport but has since continued to host the 101st Air Refueling Wing, Maine Air National Guard, part of the Northeast Tanker Task Force.

In 1990, the USAF East Coast Radar System (ECRS) Operation Center was activated in Bangor with over 400 personnel. The center controlled the over-the-horizon radar's transmitter in Moscow, Maine, and receiver in Columbia Falls, Maine. With the end of the Cold War, the facility's mission of guarding against a Soviet air attack became superfluous, and though it briefly turned its attention toward drug interdiction, the system was decommissioned in 1997 as the SSPARS system installation—the successor to the PAVE PAWS installation—in Massachusetts' Cape Cod Air Force Station reservation fully took over.

Arts and culture

Events
 One of the country's oldest fairs, the Bangor State fair has occurred annually for more than 150 years. Beginning on the last Friday of July, it features agricultural exhibits, rides, and live performances.
 The annual KahBang Music and Art Festival (now defunct).
 The annual American Folk Festival (now defunct).

Venues
 The Cross Insurance Center (which replaced the Bangor Auditorium in 2013)
 Darling's Waterfront Pavilion

Cultural institutions

 The University of Maine Museum of Art and the Maine Discovery Museum, a major children's museum was founded in 2001 in the former Freese's Department Store.
 The Bangor Symphony Orchestra.
 The Penobscot Theatre Company
 The Collins Center for the Arts

Architecture

Many buildings and monuments are listed on the National Register of Historic Places. The city has also had a municipal Historic Preservation Commission since the early 1980s. Bangor has many Greek Revival. Victorian, and Colonial Revival houses. Some notable architecture:
 The Thomas Hill Standpipe, a shingle style structure.
 The Hammond Street Congregation Church.
 The St. John's Catholic Church.
 The Bangor House Hotel, now converted to apartments, is the only survivor among a series of "Palace Hotels" designed by Boston architect Isaiah Rogers, which were the first of their kind in the United States.
 The country's second oldest garden cemetery is the Mount Hope Cemetery, designed by Charles G. Bryant.
 Richard Upjohn, British-born architect and early promoter of the Gothic Revival style, received some of his first commissions in Bangor, including the Isaac Farrar House (1833), Samuel Farrar House (1836), Thomas A. Hill House (presently owned by the Bangor Historical Society), and St. John's Church (Episcopal, 1836–1839).
 Bangor Public Library by Peabody and Stearns.
 The Eastern Maine Insane Hospital, now Dorothea Dix Psychiatric Center, by John Calvin Stevens.
 The William Arnold House of 1856, an Italianate style mansion and home to author Stephen King. Its wrought-iron fence with bat and spider web motif is King's own addition.

Public art and monuments

The bow-plate of the battleship USS Maine, whose destruction in Havana, Cuba, presaged the start of the Spanish–American War, survives on a granite memorial by Charles Eugene Tefft in Davenport Park.

Bangor has a large fiberglass-over-metal statue of mythical lumberman Paul Bunyan by Normand Martin (1959).

There are three large bronze statues in downtown Bangor by sculptor Charles Eugene Tefft of Brewer, including the Luther H. Peirce Memorial, commemorating the Penobscot River Log-Drivers; a statue of Hannibal Hamlin at Kenduskeag Mall; and an image of "Lady Victory" at Norumbega Parkway.

The abstract aluminum sculpture "Continuity of Community" (1969) on the Bangor Waterfront, formerly in West Market Square, is by the Castine sculptor Clark Battle Fitz-Gerald.

The U.S. Post Office in Bangor contains Yvonne Jacquette's 1980 three-part mural "Autumn Expansion".

A 1962 bronze commemorating the 2nd Maine Volunteer Infantry Regiment by Wisconsin sculptor Owen Vernon Shaffer stands at the entrance to Mount Hope Cemetery.

A memorial has been placed by Bangor City Council and members of the LGBT community along the Kenduskeag Stream honoring the memory of Charlie Howard as the victim of a hate crime. In 1984 he was beaten and thrown off Bangor's State Street Bridge by three young men in a what would become a high-profile example of violence against LGBT people. The murder of Charlie Howard inspired the formation of The Maine Lesbian/Gay Political Alliance, which later became EqualityMaine. In May 2011, vandals spray-painted graffiti and an anti-gay slur on the memorial. Family and friends cleaned it up and rededicated it.

Sports

From 2002 to 2017, Bangor had been home to Little League International's Senior League World Series.

Bangor was home to two minor league baseball teams affiliated with the 1995–1998 Northeast League: the Bangor Blue Ox (1996–1997) and the Bangor Lumberjacks (2003–2004). Even earlier the Bangor Millionaires (1894–1896) played in the New England League.

Vince McMahon promoted his first professional wrestling event in Bangor in 1979. In 1985, the WWC Universal Heavyweight Championship changed hands for the first time outside of Puerto Rico at an IWCCW show in Bangor.

The Penobscot is a salmon-fishing river; the Penobscot Salmon Club traditionally sent the first fish caught to the President of the United States. From 1999 to 2006, low fish stocks resulted in a ban on salmon fishing. Today, the wild salmon population (and the sport) is slowly recovering. The Penobscot River Restoration Project is working to help the fish population by removing some dams north of Bangor.

The Kenduskeag Stream Canoe Race, a white-water event which begins just north of Bangor in Kenduskeag, has been held since 1965.

Government
Bangor is the county seat of Penobscot County.

Since 1931, Bangor has had a Council-Manager form of government. The nine-member City Council is a non-partisan body, with three city councilors elected to three-year terms each year. The nine council members elect the Chair of the City Council, who is referred to informally as the mayor, and plays the role when there is a ceremonial need. As of 2019, the council members are Clare Davitt, Sarah Dubay, Rick Fournier, Susan Hawes, Sarah Nichols, Angela Okafor, Gretchen Schaefer, Jonathan Sprague, and Dan Tremble (chair).

In 2007, Bangor was the first city in the U.S. to ban smoking in vehicles carrying passengers under the age of 18.

In 2012, Bangor's City Council passed an order in support of same-sex marriage in Maine. In 2013, the City of Bangor also signed an amicus brief to the United States Supreme Court calling for the federal Defense of Marriage Act to be struck down.

In the United States House of Representatives, Bangor is included in Maine's 2nd congressional district and is currently represented by Democrat Jared F. Golden.

Law and order
In 2008 Bangor's crime rate was the second-lowest among American metropolitan areas of comparable size. As of 2014 Bangor had the third highest rate of property crime in Maine.

The arrival of Irish immigrants from nearby Canada beginning in the 1830s, and their competition with locals for jobs, sparked a deadly sectarian riot in 1833 that lasted for days and had to be put down by militia. Realizing the need for a police force, the town incorporated as The City of Bangor in 1834.  In the 1800s, sailors and loggers gave the city a reputation for roughness; their stomping grounds were known as the "Devil's Half Acre". The same name was also applied, at roughly the same time, to The Devil's Half-Acre, Pennsylvania.

Although Maine was the first "dry" state (i.e. the first to prohibit the sale of alcohol, with the passage of the "Maine law" in 1851), Bangor managed to remain "wet". The city had 142 saloons in 1890. A look-the-other-way attitude by local police and politicians (sustained by a system of bribery in the form of ritualized fine-payments known as "The Bangor Plan") allowed Bangor to flout the nation's most long-standing state prohibition law. In 1913, the war of the "drys" (prohibitionists) on "wet" Bangor escalated when the Penobscot County Sheriff was impeached and removed by the Maine Legislature for not enforcing anti-liquor laws. His successor was asked to resign by the Governor the following year for the same reason, but refused. A third sheriff was removed by the Governor in 1918, but promptly re-nominated by the Democratic Party. Prohibitionist Carrie Nation had been forcibly expelled from the Bangor House hotel in 1902 after causing a disturbance.

In October 1937, "public enemy" Al Brady and another member of his "Brady Gang" (Clarence Shaffer) were killed in the bloodiest shootout in Maine's history. FBI agents ambushed Brady, Shaffer, and James Dalhover on Bangor's Central Street after they had attempted to purchase a Thompson submachine gun from Dakin's Sporting Goods downtown. Brady is buried in the public section of Mount Hope Cemetery, on the north side of Mount Hope Avenue. Until recently, Brady's grave was unmarked. A group of schoolchildren erected a wooden marker over his grave in the 1990s, which was replaced by a more permanent stone in 2007.

Education
Universities and colleges
 The University of Maine (originally The Maine State College) was founded in Orono in 1868. It is part of the University of Maine System.
 The Bangor campus of the University of Maine at Augusta.
 Husson University enrolls about 3,500 students a year in a variety of undergraduate and graduate programs.
 Beal College was founded in 1891 and offers degrees in nursing, healthcare, business and more.
 The Bangor Theological Seminary, founded in 1814, is the only accredited graduate school of religion in northern New England.

Bangor School Department operates public schools, including Bangor High School, the only public high school in the municipality. In 2013 it was named a National Silver Award winner by U.S. News & World Reports "America's Best High Schools".

Private schools include:
 The private John Bapst Memorial High School. In 2012 it was ranked in the top 20% nationally by the Washington Post High School Challenge.
 The private Bangor Christian Schools
 All Saints Catholic School, of the Roman Catholic Diocese of Portland, is in Bangor.

Media
The Bangor region has a large number of media outlets for an area its size. The city has an unbroken history of newspaper publishing extending from 1815. Almost thirty dailies, weeklies, and monthlies had been launched there by the end of the Civil War.

The Bangor Daily News was founded in the late 19th century, and is one of the few remaining family-owned newspapers left in the United States. The Maine Edge is published from Bangor.

Bangor has more than a dozen radio stations and seven television stations, including WLBZ 2 (NBC), WABI 5 (CBS; CW on DT2), WVII 7 (ABC), WBGR-LD 33 (MeTV), and WFVX-LD 22 (Fox/MyNetworkTV). Maine Public Broadcasting Network outlet WMEB 12, licensed to nearby Orono, is the area's PBS member station. Radio stations in the city include WKIT and WZON, owned by Zone Radio Corporation, a company owned by Bangor resident novelist Stephen King. WHSN is a non-commercial alternative rock station licensed to Bangor and run and operated by staff and students at the New England School of Communications on the campus of Husson University. Several other stations in the market are owned by Blueberry Broadcasting and Townsquare Media.

Infrastructure

Road 
Bangor sits along interstates I-95 and I-395; U.S. highways US 1A, US 2, US Route 2A, US 202; and state routes SR 9,  SR 15, SR 15 Business, SR 100, and SR 222.  Three major bridges connect the city to neighboring Brewer: Joshua Chamberlain Bridge (carrying US 1A), Penobscot River Bridge (carrying SR 15), and the Veterans Remembrance Bridge (carrying I-395).

Daily intercity bus service from Bangor proper is provided by two companies. Concord Coach Lines connects Bangor with Augusta, Portland, several towns in Maine's midcoast region, and Boston, Massachusetts. Cyr Bus Lines provides daily service to Caribou and several northern Maine towns along I-95 and Route 1. The area is also served by Greyhound, which operates out of Dysart's Truck Stop in neighboring Hermon.  West's Bus Service provides service between Bangor and Calais.

In 2011, Acadian Lines ended bus service to Saint John, New Brunswick, because of low ticket sales.

The Community Connector system offers public transportation within Bangor and to adjacent towns such as Orono. There is also a seasonal (summer) shuttle between Bangor and Bar Harbor.

Rail

Freight service is provided by Pan Am Railways and Central Maine and Quebec Railway, the latter being a successor to locally based Bangor and Aroostook Railroad and Montreal, Maine and Atlantic Railway.

Passenger rail service was provided most recently by the New Brunswick Southern Railway, which in 1994 discontinued its route to Saint John, New Brunswick.

For historic Bangor trolley service see Bangor Railway and Electric Company.

Rail accidents
 1869: The Black Island Railroad Bridge north of Old Town, Maine collapsed under the weight of a Bangor and Piscataquis Railroad train, killing 3 crew and injuring 7–8 others.
 1871: A bridge in Hampden collapsed under the weight of a Maine Central Railroad train approaching Bangor, killing 2 and injuring 50.
 1898: A Maine Central Railroad train crashed near Orono killing 2 and fatally injuring 4. The president of the railroad and his wife were also on board in a private car, but escaped injury. Train Wrecked in Maine
 1899: The collapse of a gangway between a train and a waiting ferry at Mount Desert sent 200 members of a Bangor excursion party into the water, drowning 20.
 1911: A head-on collision of two trains north of Bangor, in Grindstone, killed 15, including 5 members of the Presque Isle Brass Band.

Air
Bangor is the last (or first) American airport along the great circle route between the U.S. East Coast and Europe, and in the 1970s and '80s it was a refuelling stop, until the development of longer-range jets in the 1990s.

Healthcare

Hospitals

Bangor is home to two large hospitals, the Eastern Maine Medical Center and the Catholic-affiliated St. Joseph Hospital. As of 2012, the Bangor Metropolitan Statistical Area (Penobscot County) ranked in the top fifth for physicians per capita nationally (74th of 381).  It is also within the top ten in the Northeast (i.e. north of Pennsylvania) and the top five in New England.  In 2013, U.S. News & World Report ranked the Eastern Maine Medical Center as the second best hospital in Maine.

Pandemics

In 1832, a cholera epidemic in Saint John, New Brunswick, (part of the Second cholera pandemic) sent as many as eight hundred poor Irish immigrants walking to Bangor. This was the beginning of Maine's first substantial Irish-Catholic community. Competition with Americans for jobs caused a riot and resulting fire in 1833.  In 1849–50, the Second cholera pandemic reached Bangor itself, killing 20–30 within the first week, 112 had died by October 1849.  The final death toll was 161. A late outbreak of the disease in 1854 killed seventeen others. The victims in most cases were poor Irish immigrants.  In 1872, a smallpox epidemic closed local schools.  The Spanish flu pandemic of 1918, which was global in scope, struck over a thousand Bangoreans and killed more than a hundred. This was the worst 'natural disaster' in the city's history since the cholera epidemic of 1849.

Popular culture 
Bangor is mentioned in the songs King of the Road, I've Been Everywhere, How 'Bout Them Cowgirls, and What the Cowgirls Do.

In 1977, tourist Erwin Kreuz mistook the city for San Francisco.

Marvel Comics villain MODOK is from Bangor, Maine.

Julie "The Cat" Gaffney from The Mighty Ducks film franchise is from Bangor, Maine.

Bangor International Airport is the main set for the TV series The Langoliers.

Stephen King's novels mention Bangor many times. See his bibliography.

Sister cities 
  Harbin, Heilongjiang, China
  Saint John, New Brunswick, Canada

Notable people

 List of people from Bangor, Maine

References

External links

 City of Bangor official website

 
Cities in Maine
Cities in Penobscot County, Maine
County seats in Maine
Logging communities in the United States
Populated places established in 1791
Port cities and towns in Maine